The South American Youth Championship 1983 was held in Cochabamba, La Paz and Santa Cruz, Bolivia. It also served as qualification for the 1983 FIFA World Youth Championship.

Teams
The following teams entered the tournament:

 
  (host)

First round

Group A

Group B

Final round

Qualification to World Youth Championship
The three best performing teams qualified for the 1983 FIFA World Youth Championship.

External links
Results by RSSSF

South American Youth Championship
1983 in youth association football